Donald McBane (1664 - April 12, 1732) was a noted Scottish swordsman, career soldier, and fencing master, who is widely regarded as one of the most prolific duelists of all time. He was born in the Highland town of Inverness during the late seventeenth century. In 1687 McBane ran away from home, enlisting in the British army under the Duke of Marlborough. As a career soldier, he served throughout much of Europe, fighting in The War of the Spanish Succession (1701-1714), and taking part in fifteen skirmishes and sixteen battles, including Blenheim (1704) and Malplaquet (1709). By the time of the Jacobite Rising of 1715, he was serving as a sergeant in General Honeywood’s Regiment of Dragoons and guarded the Colours at the Battle of Preston. His autobiography mentions that at one point he had the command responsibility equivalent to a Colonel of Artillery, but it is unlikely he ever received an officer's commission. His Colonel made several recommendations for McBane to 'Chailcie College' (The Royal Hospital Chelsea), something only open to senior non-commissioned or warrant officers.

McBane also worked as a fencing master, and claimed to have participated in nearly one hundred duels. He fought as a gladiator at the Bear Gardens in Hockley-in-the-Hole and Marybone Fields, London, where he reportedly fought thirty-seven prizes. Among his opponents were some of the most celebrated swordsmen and fencing masters of the century, such as James Miller, Timothy Buck, and James Figg.

McBane is best known for his book, The Expert Sword-Man's Companion (1728). The book includes McBane's memoirs as well as his extensive treatise on the art of fencing, and is a major source for the study of Scottish swordsmanship. McBane's life and writings are featured in a number of classic works on fencing, including Egerton Castle's Schools and Masters of Fence (1892) and Captain Alfred Hutton's The Sword and the Centuries (1901). Hutton describes McBane as a "first class swordsman," and,

Unlike the majority of his class, he was something of a scholar, for he left behind him a work, “The Expert Swordman’s Companion,” which contains a number of wise lessons for both the small and back sword; but perhaps the most interesting part of it is the account he gives of his life when serving in Flanders under the great Duke of Marlborough. There is a rough quaintness in the style of his narrative that adds flavour to the curious anecdotes of fights in which he was engaged.

The British historian J. D. Aylward called McBane's memoir "possibly, the most ingenuous autobiography in the English language."

References 

Swordfighters